Anthonotha is a genus within the subfamily Detarioideae of the plant family Fabaceae.

Taxonomic history
The first species of the genus was described in 1806 by Palisot de Beauvois based on a specimen collected in West Africa and named Anthonotha macrophylla P.Beauv. The genus was not recognized and in 1865 Henri Baillon transferred it to the South American genus Vouapa, described by Jean Baptiste Aublet in 1775. Vouapa later became a junior synonym since the conserved name of Macrolobium was favored for the genus described by Johann Schreber in 1789.

Most species now recognized within Anthonotha were originally described within the genus Macrolobium. The species Anthonotha macrophylla continued under the illegitimate name Macrolobium palisotii described by Bentham in 1865. This was corrected by James Macbride in 1919 by publishing the correct name M. macrophyllum (P.Beauv.) Macbride.

In 1955 Léonard reinstalled Anthonotha for the rest of the African Macrolobium species, after several other species had been transferred to his newly described genera Gilbertiodendron, Paramacrolobium, and Pellegrineodendron. Léonard subclassified the reinstalled Anthonotha with 26 species into five sections. Anthonotha section Anthonotha became the genus Anthonotha in a new, narrow sense.

The species of the other four sections of Anthonotha were placed in the genera Isomacrolobium and Englerodendron by Breteler. Isomacrolobium was later synonymized with Englerodendron.

Species
Anthonotha contains the following species:
 Anthonotha acuminata (De Wild.) J.Léonard, 1957
 Anthonotha brieyi (De Wild.) J.Léonard, 1957
 Anthonotha cladantha (Harms) J.Léonard, 1955

 Anthonotha crassifolia (Baill.) J.Léonard, 1955

 Anthonotha ferruginea (Harms) J.Léonard, 1955
 Anthonotha fragrans (Baker f.) Exell & Hillc., 1955

 Anthonotha gilletii (De Wild.) J.Léonard, 1957

 Anthonotha lamprophylla (Harms) J.Léonard, 1955

 Anthonotha macrophylla P.Beauv., 1806
 Anthonotha mouandzae Breteler, 2010

 Anthonotha noldeae (Rossberg) Exell & Hillc., 1955

 Anthonotha pellegrinii Aubrév., 1968
 Anthonotha pynaertii (De Wild.) Exell & Hillc., 1955

 Anthonotha stipulacea (Benth.) J.Léonard, 1955

 Anthonotha trunciflora (Harms) J.Léonard, 1955

 Anthonotha wijmacampensis Breteler, 2010
 Anthonotha xanderi Breteler, 2010

Phylogeny
The following relationships have been suggested for the genus Anthonotha:

References

 
Fabaceae genera
Taxonomy articles created by Polbot